Chen Ruei-min is a Taiwanese politician.

Chen served as deputy minister of the Directorate General of Budget, Accounting and Statistics under Chu Tzer-ming.

References

Living people
Year of birth missing (living people)
Government ministers of Taiwan